Lars Gabriel Romanus (born 25 January 1939) is a Swedish liberal politician. He served as Minister of Social Affairs 1978–1979, as a member of the Riksdag 1969–1982 and again 2002–2006. He has chaired the Swedish delegation to the Nordic Council and was President of the council in 2004. He has also been chairman of Svenska Barnboksinstitutet. Romanus was the CEO of Systembolaget from 1982 to 1999. He has worked for restrictive politics on alcohol for a long time.

References

1939 births
Living people
Members of the Riksdag 1976–1979
Members of the Riksdag 1979–1982
Members of the Riksdag 2002–2006
Members of the Riksdag from the Liberals (Sweden)
People from Helsingborg